The Impossible Itself is a 2010 documentary film produced and directed by Jacob Adams to cover the 1957 San Francisco Actor's Workshop production of the Samuel Beckett stage play Waiting For Godot that was taken to San Quentin Prison and performed before its inmates, with an examination of an earlier incarnation of Godot as performed by inmates at the Luttringhausen Prison in Germany in 1953.

Background
Adams was 19 when he began working to raise the money to create the film. During filming, Adams travelled to Germany in 2000 and interviewed former Prison Pastor Hans Freitag about the performances. Freitag stated on camera that inmates were allowed to leave the prison to perform Godot in a Jewish Cultural Building in Frankfurt and provided documentary evidence to support his claim. Adams himself later cross-checked the inmate names with names collected in the Holocaust Registry of Nazi officers and found two highly likely matches. The film posits this irony.

The film was dealt a budgetary setback by Swedish theatre director :fr:Jan Jönson in 2001 when Adams had travelled to New York City to meet Jönson for an interview. Jönson failed to show and the travel expenditures cost the project $2,000. Production was then suspended until 2006 before continuing with funds provided through the director's student loans. In total, it took 9 years to complete all the interviews and editing. The film's original version was completed in 2008.

Synopsis
The film documents the 1957 San Francisco Actor's Workshop production of the Samuel Beckett's play Waiting For Godot which was performed live before inmates at San Quentin Prison. The film also examines a 1953 performance of Godot by inmates at the Luttringhausen Prison in Germany, providing new scholarship material on those performances.

Cast
The documentary features interviews with former S.F. Actor's Workshop members Herbert Blau, Alan Mandell, Eugene Roche, Robert Symonds, Robin Wagner, Joseph Miksak, Tony Miksak, and David Irving as well as former prison inmates Rick Cluchey, Ed Reed, Professor John Irwin and Prison Recreation Supervisor Clem Swagerty.

Release

The documentary qualified for Academy Award consideration as a documentary short subject in 2008 but failed to gain a nomination.

After 2008, the film was lengthened and distribution began in 2010, finding a home in such universities as Stanford, Duke, Berkeley, UNC, USC, Kansas State and many others.

The film was "turned down" by KQED programmer Scott Dwyer as "too academic". It was supported by BBC programmer Roger Thompson, but voted against by their committee. It was presented at an Honorarium through Professor David Lloyd of USC.

The film was turned down by the following: Sundance, Cannes, Slamdance, Austin, RiverRun, many others.

External links
 
 

2010 films
2010 documentary films
American documentary films
Documentary films about the penal system
Documentary films about theatre
Films set in San Quentin State Prison
Samuel Beckett
2010s English-language films
2010s American films